London Arch (formerly London Bridge) is an offshore natural arch  in the Port Campbell National Park, Australia.  The arch is a significant tourist attraction along the Great Ocean Road near Port Campbell in Victoria. This stack was formed by a gradual process of erosion, and until 1990 formed a complete double-span natural bridge.

The span closer to the shoreline collapsed unexpectedly on January 15, 1990, leaving two tourists (Kelli Harrison and David Darrington) stranded on the outer span before being rescued by police helicopter. No one was injured in the event. Prior to the collapse, the arch was known as London Bridge because of its similarity to its namesake.

See also
The Twelve Apostles, Victoria
Loch Ard Gorge
The Gibson Steps
The Grotto
Percé Rock in Canada, another double arch where one collapsed

References

External links

Official Website for 12 Apostles Region of Victoria
Why do arches fall ? on the website of Geoscience Australia.

Natural arches
Landforms of Victoria (Australia)
Stacks of Australia
Rock formations of  Victoria (Australia)
Great Ocean Road
Collapsed arches